Jaiquawn Jarrett (born September 21, 1989) is a former American football safety. He was drafted by the Philadelphia Eagles in the second round of the 2011 NFL Draft. He played college football at Temple.

Professional career

Pre-draft
Jarrett was projected to be drafted in the third or fourth round of the 2011 NFL Draft.

Philadelphia Eagles
Jarrett was selected by the Philadelphia Eagles in the second round (54th overall) of the 2011 NFL Draft. He was signed to a four-year contract on July 27, 2011. Jarrett was released by the Philadelphia Eagles on September 11, 2012.

New York Jets
Jarrett signed a future/reserve contract with the New York Jets on December 31, 2012. Jarrett entered the 2013 preseason competing with Antonio Allen for the starting free safety job. Jarret had his breakout performance against the Steelers in 2014, earning 2 interceptions, 10 tackles, a sack, and a fumble recovery.

On April 24, 2015, Jarrett signed the one-year, restricted free agent tender to stay with the Jets. He was waived/injured by the Jets on October 24. After clearing waivers, the Jets placed him on injured reserve three days later.

References

External links
 
 New York Jets bio
 Philadelphia Eagles bio
 Temple Owls football bio

1989 births
Living people
Sportspeople from Brooklyn
Players of American football from New York City
American football safeties
Temple Owls football players
Philadelphia Eagles players
New York Jets players
Fort Hamilton High School alumni